List of schools in Aberdeen City, Scotland. (An asterisk denotes a privately funded school.)

There are 14 secondary schools (11 state, 3 private); 52 primary schools (48 state, 4 private) and 1 state special educational needs schools.

All the listed state schools are run by Aberdeen City Council.

Secondary schools 
 
 Aberdeen Grammar School
 Albyn School *
 Bridge of Don Academy
 Bucksburn Academy
 Cults Academy
 Dyce Academy
 Harlaw Academy
 Hazlehead Academy
 Lochside Academy
 Northfield Academy 
 Oldmachar Academy
 Robert Gordon's College *
 St Machar Academy
 St Margaret's School for Girls *
 The International School Aberdeen *

Primary schools 

 Abbotswell Primary School
 Airyhall Primary School
 Albyn School *
 Ashley Road Primary School
 Braehead Primary School
 Bramble Brae Primary School
 Brimmond Primary School
 Broomhill Primary School
 Charleston Primary School
 Cornhill Primary School
 Culter Primary School
 Cults Primary School
 Danestone Primary School
 Dyce Primary School
 Fernielea Primary School
 Ferryhill Primary School
 Forehill Primary School
 Gilcomstoun Primary School
 Glashieburn Primary School
 Greenbrae Primary School
 Hanover Street Primary School
 Hazlehead Primary School
 Heathryburn Primary School	
 Holy Family Roman Catholic Primary School
 Kaimhill Primary School
 Kingsford Primary School
 Kingswells Primary School
 Kirkhill Primary School
 Kittybrewster Primary School
 Loirston Primary School
 Manor Park Primary School
 Middleton Park Primary School
 Mile-End Primary School
 Milltimber Primary School
 Muirfield Primary School
 Quarryhill Primary School
 Riverbank Primary School
 Robert Gordon's College *
 Scotstown Primary School
 Seaton Primary School
 Skene Square Primary School
 St Joseph's Roman Catholic Primary School
 St Margaret's School for Girls *
 St Peter's Roman Catholic Primary School
 Stoneywood Primary School
 Sunnybank Primary School
 The International School Aberdeen *
 Tullos Primary School
 Walker Road Primary School
 Westpark Primary School
 Woodside Primary School

Special Schools
 Orchard Brae School

Schools in Aberdeen
Schools